The Huawei U121, Playset and the Vodafone 716 are 3G mobile camera phones designed and manufactured by Chinese telecommunications equipment supplier Huawei. The phone is most common in its Vodafone UK form, where it was announced in 2008 and is branded as a Vodafone product, and sold as a budget pay as you talk phone. It's also sold by Polish Play network as Playset.

Features
The U121 features a 1.3 megapixel camera that supports video, a 3.5mm standard headphone port, video streaming and video calling, FM radio, a microSD slot, bluetooth, web and email, SMS and MMS, an MP3 player, a voice recorder, image editing, note writer, worldwide clock and numerous other common features.

Vodafone
Huawei mobile phones
Mobile phones introduced in 2007